Malabari goats are bred in Malabar district of Kerala, and are sometimes called Tellicherry goats. They are bred mostly for meat, but it also produces milk. Females weigh an average of 30.68kg while males weigh 41.20kg, and their coats are white, black, or piebald. Although they are similar to the Beetal goat, Malabari goats weigh less, have shorter ears and legs, and have larger testicles. There was an effort to crossbreed the Malabari goats with Boer goats, but this practice is controversial.

References

Goat breeds
Meat goat breeds